Finland was represented by Kojo, with the song "Nuku pommiin", at the 1982 Eurovision Song Contest, which took place in Harrogate on 24 April. Kojo was the winner of the Finnish national final for the contest, held on 19 February. The song was chosen through a national final organised by broadcaster Yle.

Before Eurovision

Euroviisukarsinta 1982 
The national final was held at the Kulttuuritalo in Helsinki, hosted by Heikki Kahila. 
The winner was chosen by an "expert" jury.

At Eurovision 
On the night of the final Kojo performed 6th in the running order, following Turkey and preceding Switzerland. At the close of voting "Nuku pommiin" received "nul points", placing Finland 18th (last) of the 18 entries. The Finnish jury awarded its 12 points to the runner up song from Israel.

Voting 
Finland did not receive any points at the 1982 Eurovision Song Contest.

References

External links
 Parts of the national final on Yle Elävä Arkisto

1982
Countries in the Eurovision Song Contest 1982
Eurovision
Eurovision